Radio Inside is a 1994 American drama film, written and directed by Jeffrey Jackson Bell.

Plot
Having graduated from college, Matthew Anderson travels to Florida to spend some time with his older brother while deciding what career to pursue. He is not motivated by money or desire for worldly success; he spends a great deal of time observing marine creatures at the local marine life observation station, and successfully defends his right (against the landlady) to have a small aquarium in the rented apartment. He also earns a significant paycheck by writing radio advertisements, but that sort of work repels him. Urged by his brother to get a job, he becomes a lifeguard at the municipal swimming pool.

In flashback scenes the audience learns that the boys used to spend pleasant summers at a Wisconsin lake with their family, often swimming across the lake for sport. The final such summer ended in tragedy - Michael had been busy with his career by then and was not at the lake; Matthew and his father began swimming across the lake but the father suffered cramps midway and drowned despite Matthew's frantic efforts to save him.

Much of the film is devoted to Matthew's inner thoughts, including his conversations and visits with Jesus.  Matthew tells us at the film's beginning that his stream-of-consciousness thoughts are like having a radio inside, with the dial being constantly tuned across the spectrum of available stations.

Michael is dating a girl, Natalie, and is considering asking her hand in marriage. However, he is often insensitive to her emotional needs, a fact which his younger brother recognizes and tries to help with.  Matthew then becomes emotionally attached to Natalie, but finally realizes that in order to keep his brother, he must give Natalie up, much as he gave up his father. The heaviness of this realization drives him to a suicide attempt. He concludes that God wants people to give everything to God, at least everything they value dearly.

Cast
 William McNamara as Matthew Anderson
 Elisabeth Shue as Natalie
 Dylan Walsh as Michael Anderson
 Peewee Love as T.J.
 Leslie Erganian as Mrs. Anderson
 Steve Zurk as Mr. Anderson
 Ilse Earl as Mrs. Piccalo, the landlady
 Ara Madzounian as Jesus
 Tony Fabozzi as Ford
 Brett Murray as Young Matthew Anderson
 Justin Taylor as Young Michael Anderson

References

External links
 
 
 
 

1994 films
1994 romantic drama films
Films shot in Florida
Films shot in Miami
Metro-Goldwyn-Mayer films
1990s English-language films